Christmas Comes to Willow Creek is a 1987 American made-for-television drama film directed by Richard Lang and produced by Billie André and Blue André, with the screenplay written by Michael Norell and Andy Siegel.

The film stars John Schneider and Tom Wopat (reunited from The Dukes of Hazzard, and one of the few projects in which the pair didn't play the Duke cousins), with Kim Delaney, Zachary Ansley, Joy Coghill and Hoyt Axton. Music for the film includes songs written and recorded by Billy Milo.

Scenes set in Willow Creek were filmed in Dawson City, Yukon, with the Palace Grand Theatre's exterior representing the general store.

Plot
Willow Creek, Alaska is going through problems because the town's main business, a cannery, has closed and many residents no longer have jobs. Ray and Pete are brothers; although they share the same profession (truck drivers), they are different as day and night.

Pete (played by Tom Wopat) is trying to figure out what to do with his rebellious son Michael (played by Zachary Ansley), who is angry that his father is always on the road trucking; meantime, he also has to deal with Ray (played by John Schneider), a troublesome recluse who has problems of his own, including a pregnant spouse, who had left Pete for Ray in the first place.

Ray and Pete are hired by an old friend, Al Bensinger (played by Hoyt Axton), to bring Christmas presents and a very big surprise from California all the way up to his home town of Willow Creek, Alaska. The brothers do not realize that they will have to rely on one another and along the way, the brothers and Pete's son argue and get stuck in a blizzard; meanwhile Ray's wife goes into labor. As she gives birth, they finally reconcile with each other, and arrive at their destination greeted by a crowd of happy townspeople. Earlier in the movie, it is discovered that Ray was a champion chili cooker, and the surprise is that Al has loaded the truck with enough supplies to reopen the cannery and manufacture chili. Ray and his spouse like the small town and decide to stay and help the cannery get working again. Pete informs his son that Al has made him a partner in their company, so he won't have to drive a truck anymore and they can be closer together from here on out.

Cast
 John Schneider - Ray
 Tom Wopat - Pete
 Kim Delaney - Jessie
 Zachary Ansley - Michael
 Joy Coghill - Charlotte
 Hoyt Axton - Al Bensinger
 Brian MacDonald - Dwayne
 Dwight Koss - Mayor Newman
 Barbara Russell - Edna Mae
 Ted Stidder - Doc
 Robert Forsythe - Chief Cobb
 Charissa Reeves - Sabrina
 Geordie Needham - Thurgood
 Robin Mossley - Cecil

See also
 List of Christmas films

References

External links
 
 

1987 television films
1987 films
1980s Christmas drama films
American Christmas drama films
CBS network films
Christmas television films
Films scored by Charles Fox
Films set in Alaska
Films shot in Vancouver
Films shot in Yukon
Films directed by Richard Lang (director)
American drama television films
1980s English-language films
1980s American films